Oleg Yuriyovych Vernyayev (born 29 September 1993) is a Ukrainian artistic gymnast. He is the 2016 Olympic parallel bars champion and individual all-around silver medalist. Vernyayev is also the 2014 World parallel bars champion, the 2015 European individual all-around champion and the 2017 European individual all-around champion.

Vernyayev tested positive for the banned substance meldonium in an out-of-competition test in August 2020.  He received a four-year ban, starting in November 2020.  In early 2023 the Court of Arbitration for Sport reduced the ban to two years after Vernyayev successfully appealed his case.

Personal life
Vernyayev was born in Donetsk. He was educated at the Donetsk State Institute of Health, Physical Education and Sport.

Vernyayev resides in Kyiv. He is coached by Gennady Sartynsky.

Career

2011
During the 2011 Summer Universiade Vernyayev competed in the men's vault final, finishing in 7th with a score of 15.262. He was also part of the Ukrainian team that finished 5th in the men's team final. At the 2011 World Artistic Gymnastics Championships he competed in the team all-around event, teaming with Nikolai Kuksenkov, Vitaliy Nakonechnyi, Oleg Stepko, Igor Radivilov and Roman Zozulya, finishing in 5th. He scored 14.461 on floor, 13.866 on pommel horse, 14.833 on vault, and 13.800 on parallel bars.

2012
Vernyayev finished 6th in the 2012 American Cup with a score of 88.132. At the 2012 European Men's Artistic Gymnastics Championships he participated in the team all-around final for the Ukrainian team that finished in 5th. He also made the parallel bars final, finishing in 2nd place with a score of 15.66, 0.1 points behind the winner Marcel Nguyen.

He was victorious in the all-around final of the Ukrainian Championships, scoring 90.300 points and winning by a margin of 2.65 points over 2nd place Oleg Stepko.

Vernyayev competed for the national team at the 2012 Summer Olympics in the men's artistic team all-around, alongside Nikolai Kuksenkov, Vitalii Nakonechnyi, Oleg Stepko and Igor Radivilov, and the men's artistic individual all-around. In qualification he scored 88.964 to finish in 13th place. In the team final Ukraine finished in 4th with a score of 271.526, missing out on a medal by less than 0.2 points. Ukraine were initially awarded 3rd place for a bronze medal, however following an appeal from Japan over a pommel horse score, they were awarded an extra 0.7 points, allowing them to move from 4th place to 2nd knocking Ukraine out of the medals in the process.  He finished in 11th place in the individual all-around final with a score of 88.931.

2013
Vernyayev won the Ukrainian National Championships. He took the silver medal in individual all-around at the 2013 American Cup. He then won the bronze medal in all-around at the 2013 European Championships in Moscow, Russia.

At the 2013 Summer Universiade, Vernyayev led his Ukrainian team (Ihor Radivilov, Oleg Stepko, Petro Pakhnyuk and Maksym Semiankiv) to a second-place finish in the team final and qualified for the all-around final. He won the all-around bronze medal (tied with Russian gymnast David Belyavskiy). He won another bronze medal in the parallel bars final.

2014
In May 2014, at the 2014 European Championships in Sofia, Vernyayev contributed scores of 15.100 (floor), pommel horse (14.400), rings (14.900), vault (14.783), 15.591 (parallel bars) and 14.600 (horizontal bar), helping Ukraine win the team bronze medal with a total score of 262.087 points behind Great Britain. In event finals, Vernyayev won the gold in parallel bars (15.966) and won bronze medal in vault (14.916).

He won gold in parallel bars at the 2014 World Championships in Nanning. After the wrong anthem (the anthem of Uzbekistan) was played during the medal ceremony, he said "It was written in my face that I didn't like it. They came up and apologised for the anthem and promised to change it for TV broadcast. But I thought it would be incorrect, because I screwed up my face and it will be even worse if the anthem is replaced."

2015

In March Vernyayev won the American Cup in Arlington, Texas. He won with a score of 90.597, 0.499 over silver medalist and 2013 World Championships all-around silver medalist Ryōhei Katō of Japan. Vernyayev also became the FIG World Cup series champion in addition to winning the American Cup.

At the 2015 European Artistic Gymnastics Championships Vernyayev won the individual all-around with a score of 89.582, beating 2013 champion David Belyavskiy. He also qualified to the parallel bars final where he won the gold medal with a score of 15.866.

At the 2015 European Games, Vernyayev was part of the Ukrainian team, winning silver in the team final behind Russia. Vernyayev qualified into the all-around, floor, pommel horse, vault, parallel bars and high bar finals. He won the all-around final with a score of 90.332, and the vault final with a score of 15.266. He placed 6th in the floor final with 14.233, and 5th on pommel horse (13.833), parallel bars (14.633) and high bar (14.900).

2016
At the 2016 European Championships, Vernyayev won a gold medal on vault and a silver medal on parallel bars.

In August 2016, Vernyayev claimed silver in the men's all-around competition at the Rio Olympics with a score of 92.266, only 0.099 behind Kōhei Uchimura's 92.365. This was the closest anyone had scored to Uchimura since 2008.  It was considered by many the best all-around duel in men's gymnastics history.

Vernyayev also gained prominence due to his public apology over the Ukrainian squad's strategy during the team final, when due to injuries they did not put up gymnasts on all events, effectively ruling the team out of contention.
Vernyayev won the gold medal in the parallel bar competition, scoring 16.041, and finished 5th in the vault final and 8th on pommel horse and the horizontal bar.  It was Ukraine's first gymnastics gold at the Games since 2004.   His all-around medal was also Ukraine's first since the bronze of Alexander Beresch at the 2000 Games.

2017
At the 2017 European Championships, Vernyayev won gold medals in the individual all-around and parallel bars and a bronze medal on vault.

At the 2017 Taipei Summer Universiade, Vernyayev won the gold medal of individual all-around, three silver medals on team, vault, and pommel horse, and one bronze medal for ring.

Doping and ban
In December 2020 Vernyayev was notified by the International Gymnastics Federation that he was provisionally suspended from competition, backdated to November 2020. The reason for the suspension was a positive test for meldonium, which was banned by the World Anti-Doping Agency starting in January 2016. Following arbitration, the provisional suspension was upheld and Vernyayev was banned from competition for four years. During this suspension timeframe Vernyayev would miss both the 2020 Olympic Games (re-scheduled to 2021) and the 2024 Olympic Games.

In July 2021 Vernyayev expressed his intention to appeal the suspension to the Court of Arbitration for Sport, contending that meldonium was not found in subsequent tests.  He acknowledged the presence of the drug in his body, but said he does not know how it got there.

On March 14, 2023 Vernyayev announced that his appeal was successful and the CAS reduced his ban to two years, resulting in his ability to return to competition immediately.

Olympic results

2012 London Olympics

2016 Rio Olympics

References

External links
 

1993 births
Living people
Sportspeople from Donetsk
Ukrainian male artistic gymnasts
Armed Forces sports society (Ukraine) athletes
Olympic gymnasts of Ukraine
Olympic gold medalists for Ukraine
Olympic silver medalists for Ukraine
Olympic medalists in gymnastics
Medalists at the 2016 Summer Olympics
Gymnasts at the 2012 Summer Olympics
Gymnasts at the 2016 Summer Olympics
Gymnasts at the 2015 European Games
Medalists at the World Artistic Gymnastics Championships
European Games medalists in gymnastics
European Games gold medalists for Ukraine
European Games silver medalists for Ukraine
Universiade medalists in gymnastics
Universiade gold medalists for Ukraine
Universiade silver medalists for Ukraine
Universiade bronze medalists for Ukraine
Medalists at the 2013 Summer Universiade
Medalists at the 2015 Summer Universiade
Medalists at the 2017 Summer Universiade
European champions in gymnastics
Ukrainian sportspeople in doping cases
Doping cases in gymnastics
Recipients of the Order of Danylo Halytsky
20th-century Ukrainian people
21st-century Ukrainian people